Yannick Étienne Stanislas Kamanan (born 5 October 1981 in Saint-Pol-sur-Mer, Nord) is a French footballer, who last played for Ware and as a striker.

Career
In January 2009 Kamanan signed for Sivasspor until June 2011. On 3 February 2009 he scored his first goal for the club in a Turkish Cup quarter final match against Galatasaray which helped Sivasspor advance to the semi final.

On 4 August 2009, at the start of the 2009–10 season, he scored Sivas's second goal in their Champions League game against Anderlecht in the second leg of the third round qualifying. The game ended 3–1 to Sivas.

On 7 January 2012, Kamanan signed a two-half-year contract with Gabala FC in Azerbaijan. After 60 appearances for the club and 17 goals, ranking third in their all time goalscorers list.

In August 2015, after a year without a club, Kamanan signed for Championnat de France amateur 2 Aulnoye.

On 7 July 2017, Ware F.C. announced the signing of Kamanan.

Career statistics

Honours
Maccabi Herzliya
Toto Cup (1): 2006–07

References

External links
 Stats at Footballplus

1981 births
Living people
People from Saint-Pol-sur-Mer
French sportspeople of Beninese descent
French footballers
French expatriate footballers
Le Mans FC players
Tottenham Hotspur F.C. players
RC Strasbourg Alsace players
Dijon FCO players
Maccabi Herzliya F.C. players
Maccabi Tel Aviv F.C. players
Sivasspor footballers
Mersin İdman Yurdu footballers
Ligue 1 players
Israeli Premier League players
Süper Lig players
Gabala FC players
Expatriate footballers in Azerbaijan
Expatriate footballers in England
Expatriate footballers in Switzerland
Expatriate footballers in Belgium
Expatriate footballers in Turkey
Expatriate footballers in Israel
Association football forwards
Sportspeople from Nord (French department)
French expatriate sportspeople in Azerbaijan
Black French sportspeople
Footballers from Hauts-de-France
French expatriate sportspeople in Turkey
French expatriate sportspeople in Israel
French expatriate sportspeople in England
French expatriate sportspeople in Switzerland
French expatriate sportspeople in Belgium